Glatter is a surname. Notable people with the surname include: 

Lesli Linka Glatter (born 1953), American film and television director
Pete Glatter (1949–2008), British Russia analyst